is a Japanese football player currently playing for Roasso Kumamoto.

National team career
In August 2007, Okamoto was elected Japan U-17 national team for 2007 U-17 World Cup. He played full time in all 3 matches as defensive midfielder and scored an opening goal against Haiti in first match.

Career statistics
Updated to 23 February 2018.

National team career statistics
As of 8 November 2008

Appearances in major competitions

Honours

Sanfrecce Hiroshima
J. League Division 1 (1) : 2013
J. League Division 2 (1) : 2008
Japanese Super Cup (2) : 2008, 2013

Japan
AFC U-17 Championship (1) : 2006

References

External links
Profile at Matsumoto Yamaga
 

1990 births
Living people
Association football people from Hiroshima Prefecture
Japanese footballers
Japan youth international footballers
J1 League players
J2 League players
J3 League players
Sanfrecce Hiroshima players
Sagan Tosu players
Shonan Bellmare players
Matsumoto Yamaga FC players
Roasso Kumamoto players
Association football midfielders